The Revolution Smile was an American alternative metal/post-grunge band from Sacramento, California.

History
The band was formed in 2000 by former Far guitarist Shaun Lopez after he briefly played in an early version of Rival Schools headed by former Quicksand frontman, Walter Schreifels, and after he auditioned for various bands, including the Foo Fighters.

In November 2000, The Revolution Smile released At War with Plastic, a six-song EP produced by Shaun, and released on Animation Records, with worldwide distribution.  In January 2001, The Revolution Smile solidified its first lineup which consisted of Octavio Gallardo on bass, Tim McCord on guitar, and Jeremy White on drums. They began working on their follow up to At War With Plastic that summer. Once again engineered, mixed, and produced by Shaun Lopez. We Are In This Alone was finished in the fall of 2001 and the band planned to release it soon after.

In January 2002, We Are In This Alone landed in the hands of Geffen records, and they signed the band. Geffen planned to remix and release We Are In This Alone, but the band wanted to make a new record.

In July 2002, The band recorded Above The Noise with Dave Sardy and Shaun Lopez, co-producing. In January 2003, Andy Wallace mixed Above The Noise, and the band launched national tours in support of the album, playing alongside Deftones, Dredg, The Music, Marilyn Manson, Korn, and many others.

September 2003, The Revolution Smile toured Europe with  Deftones and A Perfect Circle. They were also musical guests on Jimmy Kimmel Live!.  Shortly thereafter, Jeremy White and Tim parted ways with the band. Jeremy White was replaced by Stephen Hoke, and the band became a three piece.

In January 2004, the band asked to be released from their recording contract.

In July 2004, the band played The Warped Tour where they shared the stage with My Chemical Romance, Rise Against, Atmosphere, and From Autumn To Ashes.
In June 2005, the band finished Summer Ever, which was also recorded and produced by Shaun Lopez.

Shaun then took time off to produce and record other bands.  He recorded bands such as Giant Drag, and Deftones fifth album Saturday Night Wrist.

In August 2006, it was announced on Indie 103.1 that Summer Ever will receive a September 5, 2006 release on Animation Records.

The Revolution Smile has received national and international press in such publications as Spin, Revolver, Kerrang!, Alternative Press, Guitar Player, Rolling Stone online, and Q magazine called Shaun Lopez "one of the most influential guitar players of his generation".

After leaving the band, guitarist Tim McCord went on be the bass player for the rock band Evanescence.

Their song “Bonethrower” from their 2004 album Above The Noise was featured in the soundtrack for Tiger Woods PGA Tour 2004.

Discography
At War with Plastic - 2000
We Are In This Alone - 2002
Above the Noise - 2003
Summer Ever - 2006

External links
The Revolution Smile Official site
Shaun Lopez
Far

Geffen Records artists
Indie rock musical groups from California
Musical groups established in 2000
Musical groups from Sacramento, California